Nandigama may refer a town in Krishna district of Andhra Pradesh, India

 Nandigama, Guntur district
 Nandigam, Srikakulam
 Nandigam, Vizianagaram